Mount Vernon African Methodist Episcopal Church may refer to:
 Mount Vernon AME Church (Gamaliel, Kentucky)
 Mount Vernon African Methodist Episcopal Church (Palestine, Texas)